The Prince Mahidol Award is an annual award for outstanding achievements in medicine and public health worldwide. The award is given by the Prince Mahidol Award Foundation, which was founded by the Thai Royal Family in 1992.

Prince Mahidol Award Foundation 
King Bhumibol Adulyadej founded the Prince Mahidol Award Foundation on 1 January 1992 on the occasion of the 100th Anniversary of the birth of his father, Prince Mahidol Adulyadej, initially under the name "Mahidol Award Foundation", but since 28 July 1997 as "Prince Mahidol Award Foundation." In addition to the actual award, the Fund also promotes the memory of Prince Mahidol, who is regarded as the father of modern medicine and public health of Thailand. Princess Maha Chakri Sirindhorn is chairwoman of the Foundation Committee.

The award is given annually in two categories to international personalities or organizations:
 For outstanding progress in medicine
 For the active promotion of public health

and consists of:
 a medal
 a certificate
 prize money (US $100,000)

Between 1992 and 2014, 70 prizes were awarded, including 32 in medicine and 38 in public health.

Nomination process 
 Any individual or group of individuals may be nominated by a national governmental agency, or by an individual. Nominations are transmitted to the secretary-general of the Prince Mahidol Award Foundation.
 The nomination forms are forwarded to the Scientific Advisory Committee for initial screening.
 Once screened, the International Award Committee, which comprises several world-renowned experts in the fields of medicine and public health, will consider them and make recommendations to the Foundation’s Board of Trustees.
 The Foundation’s Board of Trustees makes final approval.

Prince Mahidol Award Laureates 
Source: Laureates

See also
 List of medicine awards
 List of prizes named after people

References

External links 
 Official website of the Prince Mahidol Award Foundation

International medical and health organizations
Medicine awards
Thai awards
Awards established in 1992
1992 establishments in Thailand